HaXml is a collection of utilities for parsing, filtering, transforming, and generating XML documents using Haskell. Its basic facilities include:

 a parser for XML,
 a separate error-correcting parser for HTML,
 an XML validator,
 pretty-printers for XML and HTML.

External links
 HaXml home page

Free software programmed in Haskell
XML parsers